Bakhtiari dialect is a distinct dialect of Southern Luri spoken by Bakhtiari people in Chaharmahal-o-Bakhtiari, Bushehr, eastern Khuzestan and parts of Isfahan and Lorestan provinces. It is closely related to the Boir-Ahamadi, Kohgiluyeh, and Mamasani dialects in northwestern Fars. These dialects, together with the Lori dialects of Lorestan (e.g. Khorramabadi dialect), are referred to as the “Perside” southern Zagros group, or Lori dialects. Luri and Bakhtiari are much more closely related to Persian than Kurdish." 

Bakhtiari could be seen as a  transitional idiom between Kurdish and Persian.

Reference

Sources
 F. Vahman and G. Asatrian. (1995). Poetry of the Baxtiārīs: Love Poems, Wedding Songs, Lullabies, Laments. Copenhagen: Kongelige Danske videnskabernes selskab.

Further reading

External links 
 Bakhtiari Wikipedia Beta
 

Southwestern Iranian languages